Field of blood may refer to:
Akeldama (from the Aramaic: "field of blood"), a place associated with Judas Iscariot in Jerusalem
Battle of Ager Sanguinis, near Sarmada in Syria on June 28, 1119
The Field of Blood (TV series), a 2011 BBC miniseries, based on the 2005 novel of the same name
"Fields of Blood; Harvesters of Hate", a song by Sentenced from the 1993 album North from Here
Fields of Blood, 2014 book by Karen Armstrong